The Eternal derby of Slovenian football, simply known as the Eternal derby or Slovenian derby was a football rivalry between NK Maribor and NK Olimpija, which was dissolved in 2005.

In 2005, a new club under the name of NK Bežigrad was founded and later changed its name to NK Olimpija Ljubljana. Because most of the fans that supported the dissolved Olimpija started to support Bežigrad, the continuation of the rivalry is considered by most Slovenian media and fans as the matches between Maribor and the new Olimpija Ljubljana, established in 2005 as NK Bežigrad. The new club consider themselves as the spiritual continuation of the dissolved club, however, legally, the current Olimpija Ljubljana is a distinct and separate club as treated by the Football Association of Slovenia.

History and rivalry culture

In Yugoslavia
The rivalry between Maribor and Olimpija began in the early 1960s, when the first match between the two clubs was played. Although the first match was played in 1962 it was not until the independence of Slovenia from 1991 onwards when most of the matches were played. The main reason being the fact that both clubs were part of the Yugoslav football system and, during the period from 1960 (establishment of NK Maribor) until 1991 (establishment of Slovenian league, the Slovenian PrvaLiga), played only a total of ten seasons in the same league. The two clubs were one of only three Slovenian football clubs, the other being Nafta Lendava, to play in the Yugoslav First League. Maribor played in the Yugoslav top division for a total of five seasons, between 1967–68 and 1971–72, with the best result of tenth place in 1969–70. Olimpija played in the Yugoslav first league for a total of twenty seasons, in 1953–54 and between 1965–66 and 1983–84, with the best result of seventh place in 1970–71 and 1982–83. Both clubs also played in the Yugoslav Cup, where Maribor achieved its best result in 1973 and 1980 with reaching quarter-finals, while Olimpija was the runner-up in the 1970 edition.

In Slovenia
In 1991, after Slovenia declared independence, both clubs were the founding members of the Slovenian top division, 1. SNL, and played there up until the end of the 2004–05 season and the dissolution of NK Olimpija. Until the dissolution of Olimpija, both clubs were the most successful teams in Slovenian club football. From 1991 until 2005 Maribor and Olimpija had won a combined total of eleven out of fourteen Slovenian championships (Maribor 7, Olimpija 4), and nine out of fourteen Slovenian cups (Maribor 5, Olimpija 4).

The rivalry reached its peak in the final round of the 2000–01 season, when one of the most celebrated matches in the 1. SNL history was played, when Olimpija met Maribor at their home stadium, Bežigrad. Both teams were competing for their fifth Slovenian league title. The home team needed a win for the title, while a draw was enough for Maribor. The atmosphere was electric days before the kick-off and the stadium with 8,500 seats was completely sold out. At the end, the match ended with a draw (1–1) and Maribor won their fifth consecutive title in front of 3,000 their fans that gathered in Ljubljana that day.

After the 2004–05 season, Olimpija folded due to financial issues. On 2 March 2005 a new club was established, under the name NK Bežigrad, retaining Olimpija's fans, colours and most of the youth team players. NK Bežigrad later changed its name twice. First to NK Olimpija Bežigrad and finally to NK Olimpija Ljubljana. Although the board of the newly established club and its fans see the team as the spiritual continuation of the old club, they are not regarded as the legal successors of the old NK Olimpija by the Football Association of Slovenia and are not entitled to claim the honours won by the defunct club.

However, because the new Olimpija is supported by most of the fans of the previous Olimpija, including their ultras group Green Dragons who has a long-standing rivalry with Maribor's own ultras group Viole Maribor, many see the matches between Maribor and the new club as the continuation of the rivalry and refer to it by the same name.

The first match between NK Maribor and the new NK Olimpija took place on 24 October 2007 in a Slovenian Cup quarter-final match, won by Maribor 3–1. At the time NK Olimpija was still competing under the name NK Olimpija Bežigrad.

Fans
The two teams represented the two largest cities in Slovenia, the capital city of Ljubljana and the second largest city Maribor. Overall, the two clubs were always the most popular football clubs in the country. Traditionally, Ljubljana represents the wealthier western part of the country, while Maribor is the center of the poorer eastern part. In addition, Ljubljana was always the cultural, educational, economic and political center of the country and Olimpija and its fans were considered as the representatives of the upper class. Maribor, on the other hand, was one of the most industrialized cities in Yugoslavia and the majority of its fans were the representatives of the working class, which means that the added tension to the rivalry was usually also political, social and cultural as well. However, this kind of division was much more apparent in the past, as the class differences between the fanbases have faded out and the social gap that once separated the two sides has closed over the years.

Besides the city of Maribor itself and the surrounding area, NK Maribor also has a large fan base in the whole regions of Lower Styria and Slovenian Carinthia. Olimpija on the other hand draws much of its fans from the central part of the country, the majority from the city of Ljubljana with the surrounding area of southern Upper Carniola and northwestern Lower Carniola.

Both clubs always had support on their matches from ultras groups called Viole Maribor, supporting NK Maribor, and Green Dragons who supported NK Olimpija. The two groups are among the largest in the country and it is not uncommon that the matches between the two clubs were sometimes interrupted by clashes between the two groups or with the police. On many occasions, before or after the matches, the fans of the two clubs clashed on the streets. One of the worst incidents, in April 2010 after a match, resulted in a stabbing of a member of the Green Dragons who, with a group of friends, got into a fight with members of the Viole in Ljubljana's railway station. However, to date, there has not been any fatalities in the country related to football violence.

Players
Vili Ameršek is the leading goalscorer among all players that have participated in the matches between Maribor and Olimpija. He has played in the time of SFR Yugoslavia for Olimpija and scored a total of 14 goals against Maribor. Second place is shared between Marko Kmetec and Damir Pekič who both scored 8 goals and are the most successful players after the independence of Slovenia in 1991 and the establishment of the 1. SNL. Gregor Židan, Željko Milinovič and Amir Karić are the only three players who have played for all three clubs involved in the rivalry. Židan played for the old Olimpija in the Yugoslav first league, while later playing for Maribor in the Slovenian first league, 1. SNL. He then retired, only to return to football couple of years later where he played for the new Olimpija Ljubljana, at the time still known by the name NK Bežigrad, in lower tiers of Slovenian football. Milanič on the other hand played in 1. SNL for both clubs and later joined the new Olimpija, at the time known by the name NK Bežigrad where he played less than a season and eventually finished his career. Karić also played for both Maribor and the old Olimpija in 1. SNL. After few years spent abroad he eventually joined the new Olimpija, at the time still known as NK Bežigrad and then Olimpija Bežigrad, where he played in lower tiers of Slovenian football for couple of seasons before moving to Koper.

Direct transfers
Six players have transferred directly from Maribor to Olimpija, and eight players from Olimpija to Maribor. Kliton Bozgo and Nastja Čeh have transferred directly from Maribor to Olimpija and back.

Maribor to Olimpija
Kliton Bozgo
Anton Čeh
Nastja Čeh
Edin Hadžialagić
Marko Kmetec
Sašo Lukić

Olimpija to Maribor
Damjan Gajser
Enver Čirić
Dejan Djuranović
Ismet Ekmečić
Suad Fileković
Ivica Pešić
Marko Simeunovič
Muamer Vugdalić

Honours
Official statistics of honours won by NK Maribor and NK Olimpija, established in 1945 and dissolved in 2005, as treated by the Football Association of Slovenia. The honours are counted until 2005, when Olimpija was dissolved.

Matches list

Yugoslav football leagues
The head-to-head matches shows the results of Maribor and Olimpija, when they played in the same league.

1Second Yugoslav division; 2Third Yugoslav DivisionSource: Archive data on nkmaribor.com
• Total: Olimpija 8 wins (40%), 7 draw (35%), Maribor 5 wins (25%).

Slovenian PrvaLigaThe head-to-head matches shows the results of Maribor and Olimpija.Note: For five consecutive seasons, from 1998–99 until 2002–03, 1. SNL had a three-round robin and the matches of the final third of the season were determined based on the league position after the first two thirds of the season.
• Total: Maribor 20 wins (49%), Olimpija 12 wins (29%), 9 draw (22%).

Yugoslav CupThe head-to-head matches shows the results of Maribor and Olimpija, when they played in the Yugoslav Cup. The majority of the matches were played as part of the Slovenian Republic Cup and were used as qualifiers for the main event.•Series won: Olimpija 8 (62%), Maribor 5 (38%).

Slovenian CupThe head-to-head matches shows the results of Maribor and Olimpija.• Series won: Maribor 3 (66.6%), Olimpija 2 (33.3%).

Head-to-head

StatisticsThe head-to-head statistics shows the results of NK Maribor and NK Olimpija.League rankingThe head-to-head ranking table shows the results of NK Maribor and NK Olimpija, when they played in the same division.''

1Second Yugoslav division; 2Third Yugoslav division;
• Total: Maribor 12 times higher (50%), Olimpija 12 times higher (50%).

References
Notes

Refnotes

Football derbies in Slovenia
NK Maribor
NK Olimpija Ljubljana (1945–2005)

sl:Večni derbi